Qian Nairong (born 1945 in Shanghai) is a Chinese linguist. He received a master's degree in Chinese from Fudan University in 1981. He is a professor and the head of the Chinese Department at Shanghai University. He is a researcher and advocate of Shanghainese, a dialect of Wu Chinese.

Publications
 Shanghainese Slang (Shanghai Academy of Social Sciences Press, 1989) - 《上海方言俚语》（上海社科院出版社，1989）
 Contemporary Wu-ngu Researches (Shanghai Educational Publishing House, 1992) -  《当代吴语研究》 （上海教育出版社，1992）
 Grammar for Shanghainese Language (Shanghai People's Publishing House, 1997) - 《上海话语法》 （上海人民出版社，1997）
 Cool Slang 2000 Items (Editor, Shanghai Educational Publishing House, 2001) - 《酷语2000》 （主编，上海教育出版社，2001）
 Shanghainese Conversations (Author, Touhou Shoten) -  《上海语会话》音带（本人发音，日本东方书店）
 Shanghainese & Su-zhou Dialect Researches & Studies（Co-author, Kouseikan, 1984） -  《上海语苏州语学习与研究》（合作，日本东京光生馆，1984）
 A Brief History of Dialects in Shanghai Metropolitan Areas (Shanghai Educational Publishing House, 1988) -  《上海市区方言志》（合作，上海教育出版社，1988）
 Vocabulary for Shanghainese Dialects (Shanghai Educational Publishing House, 1991) -  《上海方言词汇》（合作，上海教育出版社，1991）
 A Brief History of the Culture & Dialects for Shanghai Area (Shanghai Literature and Art Publishing House, 2001) - 《上海文化通史·语言篇》 （上海文艺出版社，2001）
 Shanghainese Dialect Collection & the Culture (Shanghai Culture Publishing House, 2002) - 《沪语盘点——上海话文化》（上海文化出版社，2002）

References

Living people
Educators from Shanghai
Writers from Shanghai
Academic staff of Shanghai University
Fudan University alumni
Linguists from China
Scientists from Shanghai
Shanghainese
1945 births
Linguists of Chinese